Carinisphindus is a genus of cryptic slime mold beetles in the family Sphindidae. There are about five described species in Carinisphindus.

Species
These five species belong to the genus Carinisphindus:
 Carinisphindus geminus McHugh & Lewis, 2000
 Carinisphindus isthmensis McHugh
 Carinisphindus platysphinctos McHugh
 Carinisphindus purpuricephalus McHugh & Lewis, 2000
 Carinisphindus skotios McHugh & Lewis, 2000

References

Further reading

 
 

Sphindidae
Articles created by Qbugbot